The Forbidden Dance (also released as The Forbidden Dance is Lambada) is a 1990 drama film starring former Miss USA Laura Harring.  Made to cash in on the Lambada dance craze by Menahem Golan's 21st Century Film Corporation, it opened on the same day (March 16, 1990) as a similarly themed film, Lambada, produced by Golan's former company Cannon Films and his cousin, Yoram Globus.

Synopsis
Nisa (Laura Harring) is a native princess of a northern Brazilian tribe who comes to Los Angeles to stop an American corporation from destroying her rainforest home. With her is tribal shaman Joa (Sid Haig), who uses black magic to get past the company guards and see the chairman of the corporation, resulting in his arrest.

Left to fend for herself in Los Angeles alone, Nisa, with the help of Carmen (Angela Moya), finds work in a Beverly Hills mansion as the servant of an uptight couple whose son, Jason (Jeff James), lives only to dance. After spying on Nisa as she dances provocatively in her bedroom, Jason takes her out to a club. She is rejected by Jason's friends, and he is berated by his parents for dating the help.

Nisa runs away and gets a job at Xtasy, a sleazy dance joint/brothel, as a dance partner for male customers. Jason's friends visits the club and want to dance with Nisa, but Nisa refuses to dance with them. One of Jason's friends (Kenny Johnson) becomes sleazy towards her and she knees him in the groin. Later, the friends tell Ashley (Barbra Brighton), Jason's girlfriend, and she runs back and tells Jason his little girlfriend is a sleaze working at Xtasy. He becomes morose, turns away from his buddies and Ashley, and goes to Xtasy to try to take Nisa out of the place. A bouncer beats up the would-be rescuer and prepares to deflower Nisa, but Joa walks in and magically stuns the attacker, which clears the place.

The shaman then heads back to the tribe, while Nisa and Jason, now in love, prepare for a dance contest, hoping to speak out about the plight of the rainforest when they are showcased on TV.

They win the contest, but the corporation's head stooge, Benjamin Maxwell (Richard Lynch), kidnaps Nisa afterwards. Jason finds them and helps Nisa to escape but twists his ankle, ruining their chances of performing on the show.

Luckily, Joa shows up backstage, heals Jason's wound, and the dance goes ahead as planned. The crowd loves them, Nisa's king father joins on stage, they start a boycott against the destruction of the rainforest, and everyone gets into the Lambada.

Cast
Laura Harring as Nisa
Jeff James as Jason Anderson
Angela Moya as Carmen
Sid Haig as Joa
Shannon Farnon as Katherine Anderson
Linden Chiles as Bradley Anderson
Pilar Del Rey as Queen
Ruben Moreno as King
Barbra Brighton as Ashley Wells
Richard Lynch as Benjamin Maxwell
Miranda Garrison as Mickey
Tom Alexander as Kurt
Connie Woods as Trish
Steven Williams as Weed
Remy O'Neil as Robin
Charles Meshack as Eddie
Sabrina Mance as Cami
Kenny Johnson as Dave
Adriana Kaegi as herself
Kid Creole as himself

Production
The Forbidden Dance was written, produced and released very quickly, in order to cash in on what some thought was a Lambada dance craze. The script was commissioned on December 7, 1989 by Sawmill Entertainment and producer Richard L. Albert, after he had seen Kaoma perform the song "Lambada" in Los Angeles.  The script was written in about ten days, and filming began within a month. Albert's Sawmill Entertainment hired the same writers and director recently employed in making the suspense film Sight Unseen, starring Susan Blakely.

The Forbidden Dance was shot on 35mm film, in and around Los Angeles, California, and was completed when a color-corrected answer print and other film elements were delivered to Columbia Pictures on March 15, 1990. Editing went on around the clock, with two separate crews of editors working while the film was being shot. Two choreographers were hired, Miranda Garrison and Felix Chavez, and the work apportioned between them. Film critic Roger Ebert visited the set during filming, as news was publicized on how fast a major-studio film could be produced. The film featured the 1989 song "Lambada" (performed by the group Kaoma), which became involved in the Lambada dance craze.

The Forbidden Dance was released on March 16, 1990, the same day as rival film Lambada – whose producers brought an action before the MPAA title registry to block the use of the word 'Lambada' in the title. Notwithstanding that attempt, posters went up in New York before the release promoting Lambada in large type followed by the tag-line 'is the Forbidden Dance', with a picture of Laura Harring and Jeff James dancing in the rain forest.

Release and reception
The film was panned by critics and received little attention in the theaters. Opening in 637 theaters, it grossed $720,864. By the end of the theatrical run, it grossed $1,823,154.

The Forbidden Dance received largely negative reviews, and currently holds a 23% on Rotten Tomatoes with an average score of 2.77/10. The film was also nominated for Worst Picture at the 1990 Stinkers Bad Movie Awards. Jon Pareles, of The New York Times, summed up The Forbidden Dance as 'B-movie drab, with its dance sequences barely sexier than a bowling tournament'. while Rita Kempley, in The Washington Post was to say 'heavy-handed and somewhat mean-spirited, The Forbidden Dance is a slap-dash message movie, about as subtle as a clog dance'.

Critics also considered The Forbidden Dance to be the worse of the two rival lambada movies, and the film grossed less than Lambada during its theatrical run. However, years after the release, the film finally found a cult following, especially after continuous re-runs on television and being sampled on the album Rainha do Gueto by pop singer Jully Luz.

Soundtrack
"Chorando Se Foi (Lambada)" - Kaoma
"Lambada A La Creole" - Kid Creole and the Coconuts, featuring Cory Daye
"Automatic" - Kid Creole and the Coconuts
"My Soul Intention (It's a Horror!)" - Kid Creole and The Coconuts
"You And Me Alone" - Mendy Lee
"Lambada: The Forbidden Dance" - José Feliciano
"Always You" - Joyce Kennedy
"Limba Limba Lambada" - Reginaldo Pi
"Capoeira" - The Dream Machine
"BH Disco" - Bob Midoff
"Good Girls Like Bad Boys" - Victor Moreno
"Hand To Hold You Over" - Mara Getz
"Last Lover" - Gene Evaro
"Reaction To Passion" - Gene Evaro
"It's Never Too Late" - Jeff Harper
"Stop, Listen, Look & Think" - Exposé

References

External links
 
 
 

1990 films
1990s dance films
1990 romantic drama films
1990s musical drama films
American dance films
American independent films
American musical drama films
American romantic drama films
American romantic musical films
1990s English-language films
Films set in Los Angeles
Films shot in Los Angeles
Columbia Pictures films
Films directed by Greydon Clark
Films with screenplays by Menahem Golan
Films about princesses
Films set in country houses
Domestic workers in films
1990s American films